Metamorphosis is a series of collage-drawings by Joan Miró, made between 1935 and 1936. This is a series of works made as an interlude while Miró was painting the series Paintings on masonite.

Description 
As the series made on Masonite, in these works the artist expresses his concern about the political situation in the 1930s, the conservative black biennium in Spain, when the conservative ministers and the central government actions led to a series of widespread protests over land and the Catalan republic cause was renewed by the army. Commentators have seen these collage pictures as adding extra depth to Miró's more colourful production on copper and masonite at this time.

2011 Exhibition
The exhibition L'escala de l'evasió that opened in October 2011 was supported by access to Wikipedia using QRpedia codes that allowed access to visitors in Catalan, English, and several other languages.

Series

References

Further reading 
 
 

1935 paintings
1936 paintings
Paintings by Joan Miró